Greatest Hits Live: The Encore Collection is a live compilation album recorded in 1998 and released by Columbia Records.

Track listing
 Two Tickets To Paradise
 Baby Hold On
 I Wanna Go Back
 Where's The Party
 Take Me Home Tonight
 Gimme Some Water
 Wanna Be A Rock-N-Roll Star
 Shakin'
 If We Ever Get Out Of This Place
 Can You Fall In Love Again Tonight

Eddie Money compilation albums
1998 live albums
1998 compilation albums
Columbia Records compilation albums
Columbia Records live albums